The Robert Morris Colonials women represented Robert Morris University in CHA women's ice hockey during the 2012-13 NCAA Division I women's ice hockey season. The Colonials finished conference play in fourth place. They made it to the semifinal game of the CHA Tournament when they were narrowly defeated by Mercyhurst.

Offseason
April 3: Former Goaltender Brianne McLaughlin was named to the US National Team for the IIHF World Championship series.

Recruiting

Transfers

Standings

Roster

2012–13 Colonials

Schedule

|-
!colspan=12 style=""| Regular Season

|-
!colspan=12 style=""|CHA Tournament

Awards and honors

Sophomore Forward Rebecca Vint was named to the CHA All-Conference First Team.

Senior Defender Jamie Joslin was named to the CHA All-Conference Second Team Team.

RMU won the Team Best Sportsmen Award.

References

Robert Morris
Robert Morris Lady Colonials ice hockey seasons
Robert
Robert